Cəfərxanlı (also, Jafarkhanly) is a village and municipality in the Jalilabad District of Azerbaijan. It has a population of 2,017.

References 

Populated places in Jalilabad District (Azerbaijan)